CCA may refer to:

Organisations
Canadian Cat Association
Canadian Cattlemen's Association, an advocacy group for the Canadian beef industry
Canadian Centre for Architecture, Montreal, Quebec
Canadian Council on Africa
CCA, a London-based talent agency founded by Howard Pays and Freddy Vale
Center for Contemporary Art Kitakyushu, Kitakyushu, Japan
Centre for Contemporary Arts, Glasgow, Scotland
Centre for Curating the Archive, at the University of Cape Town, South Africa
Children's Craniofacial Association
China Cotton Association
Climate Change Authority
Club Corporation of Asia, Hong Kong-based company and leaseholder for Brocket Hall in Hertfordshire, England
Coastal Conservation Association
Coca-Cola Amatil, a bottler of beverages in the Asia-Pacific region
Combat Command-A, a combined-arms military organization of the U.S. Army from 1942 to 1963; see Combat Command
Combatant Clergy Association, a party in Iran
Comics Code Authority
Community Choice Aggregation
Compañía Colombiana Automotriz, a former car factory in Colombia
Computer Corporation of America, a former computer software company
Concerned Children's Advertisers, former name of Companies Committed to Kids, a defunct Canadian non-profit organization
Conference of Consulting Actuaries, in the United States and Canada
Corporate Council on Africa
Corrections Corporation of America, former name of CoreCivic
Council of Canadian Academies, Ottawa, Ontario
Council for Cultural Affairs, Taiwan (now the Ministry of Culture)
Critics Choice Association 
Currency Creek Arboretum, Australia

Education
California Charter Academy
California College of the Arts
California Culinary Academy
Canyon Crest Academy
Cape Cod Academy
Chandigarh College of Architecture
Community College of Aurora
Cornish College of the Arts
Coláiste Chraobh Abhann

Religion
Catholic Campaign for America
Christian Coalition of America
Christian Conference of Asia
Cornerstone Christian Academy (disambiguation)
Covenant Christian Academy (disambiguation)

Sports
Canadian Canoe Association
Canadian Cricket Association
Canadian Curling Association
Canadian Cycling Association
Chinese Chess Association
Cruising Club of America

Economics and finance
 Capital Consumption Allowance
 Capital Cost Allowance
 Chartered Cost Accountant
 Client commission agreement

Law
 Child Citizenship Act of 2000, US
 Civil Contingencies Act 2004, UK
 Clinger–Cohen Act (1996), US
 Communist Control Act of 1954, US
 Competition and Consumer Act 2010, Australia
 Consumer Credit Act 1974, UK
 Court of Criminal Appeal (disambiguation)

Science and technology
 Canonical correlation analysis 
 Canonical correspondence analysis, a variation of correspondence analysis
 Chromated copper arsenate
 Circuit card assembly
 Climate change adaptation
 Cold cranking amperes, a measurement on a vehicle battery
 Confirmatory composite analysis
 Combinatorial clock auction
 Copper-clad aluminium wire
 CCA, a codon for the amino acid proline

Computing
 Chosen-ciphertext attack
 Cisco Clean Access, former name of Cisco NAC Appliance  
 Common Component Architecture
 Connected-component analysis
 Continuous configuration automation

Medicine
 Cholangiocarcinoma, a type of cancer that forms in the bile ducts
 Common carotid artery, in anatomy
 Congenital contractural arachnodactyly, an autosomal dominant congenital connective tissue disorder

Transportation
 Air China (ICAO callsign)
 Central Connect Airlines, a former airline based in the Czech Republic

Other uses
 Canadian Cascade Arc, the Canadian segment of the North American Cascade Volcanic Arc
 Certified Crop Advisor
 Climate Change Agreement
 Collaborative combat aircraft
 Community Conservation Areas

 Canadian Comedy Awards
 Co-curricular activity (Singapore)
 Container Corporation of America

See also
 Chartered Certified Accountant (designatory letters ACCA or FCCA)